Dmytro Vitovsky (8 November 1887 – 2 or 4 August 1919) was a Ukrainian politician and military leader.

Vitovsky was born into a family of gentry. in the village of Medukha in Galicia (today in Ivano-Frankivsk Raion). He graduated from the Stanislau gymnasium and later was a student activist at the law school of Lviv University. Later Vitovsky joined the Ukrainian Radical Party and was an active organizer of a number of Ukrainian educational and scouting Sich groups near Stanislau, which later became part of the regular Galician Army.

Vitovsky started his active military career in 1914 participating in mountain battles in the Carpathians, and was an ideologist of Ukrainian military political thought. In 1916–1917 he was a Ukrainian military commissar in Volhynia, and organized Ukrainian schools there. Vitovsky also was co-founder of the Striletsky Found, and published the official newspaper of the Ukrainian Sich Riflemen, Shliakhy ('The Pathways'). He became a company commander of the Legion of Sich Riflemen and carried out special assignments (guerrilla warfare). Towards the end of World War I Vitovsky was appointed the chairman of Ukrainian Military Committee that organized the takeover of Lviv. He became the first commander of the Ukrainian Galician Army (1–5 November 1918).

A week later after being commissioned as the first commander of the Galician Army Vitovsky was appointed as the State Secretary of Armed Forces in Levytsky's government. On 1 January 1919 he was promoted from major to colonel. As a deputy of the Ukrainian National Rada (February–April 1919), Vitovsky was chosen to attend the Paris Peace Conference as a member of the Western Ukrainian delegation in May 1919. Vitovsky was killed in an aircraft crash during the flight from Paris to Kamyanets-Podilsky on 2 August 1919 (according to older sources, Vitovsky died on 4 August 1919) and was buried in Berlin.

On 1 November 2002, the remains of Dmytro Vitovsky were reburied at the Lviv Lychakiv Cemetery on the initiative of

References

 Гай-Нижник П. Доставка для уряду Директорії українських грошей з Німеччини і загибель Д.Вітовського (1919 р.) // Гуржіївські історичні читання: Збірник наукових праць. – Черкаси, 2009. – С.290–294

Sources 
 Lviv Study. Handbook. / Compiler group manager N.Vynnytska.- Lviv: AHIL, 2003.- 52 p.

External links
 Vitovsky, Dmytro in the Internet Encyclopedia of Ukraine, vol. 5 (1993)

1887 births
1919 deaths
People from Ivano-Frankivsk Oblast
People from the Kingdom of Galicia and Lodomeria
Ukrainian nobility
Ukrainian Austro-Hungarians
Ukrainian Radical Party politicians
West Ukrainian People's Republic people
Ukrainian diplomats
University of Lviv alumni
Ukrainian people of World War I
Austro-Hungarian military personnel of World War I
Ukrainian Galician Army people
Ukrainian people of the Polish–Ukrainian War